Socialist Alternative (SA) is a Trotskyist organisation in Australia. As a revolutionary socialist group, it describes itself as aiming to organise collective struggles against oppression and inequality, while promoting the need for a revolutionary movement that could one day overthrow capitalism. Its members have been involved in organising numerous protest campaigns around issues such as LGBT rights, climate change, racism and refugee rights. The organisation also intervenes into the trade union and student union movements. It has branches and student clubs in most major Australian cities, and publishes the fortnightly newspaper Red Flag.

Since 2018, the organisation has played a leading role in the Victorian Socialists electoral alliance, a project dedicated to running socialist candidates in federal, state and local council elections. The Victorian Socialists won their first elected position in November 2020, when Socialist Alternative member Jorge Jorquera was elected to Maribyrnong Council.

History
Socialist Alternative was established in 1995 by ex-members of the former International Socialist Organisation (ISO) in Melbourne. Following debates over the orientation of the ISO to the Australian political situation, the members were expelled for arguing the ISO held "overblown" expectations of the 1990s combined with "a super-inflated estimation" of their own capabilities. This was part of the debate internationally within the International Socialist Tendency over the nature of the contemporary political situation and how socialists should respond, with the leading organisation in the Tendency, the British Socialist Workers Party arguing, the 1990s were like "the 1930s in slow motion". Like in Australia, splits occurred within the IST in other countries, including New Zealand, Greece, Germany, Canada, South Africa and France.  In addition to splits, the International Socialist Organization in the United States were expelled from the IST.

Socialist Alternative has links with a number of other groups which were previously part of the IST, such as the ISO in America, the Internationalist Workers' Left in Greece, Socialisme International in France, and both Socialist Aotearoa and the International Socialist Organisation in New Zealand. Since 2013, Socialist Alternative has maintained permanent observer status within the International Committee meeting of the Fourth International, a worldwide organisation of revolutionary Marxists.

Until 2003, Socialist Alternative was based primarily in Melbourne, when the organisation began to establish branches in other Australian cities following a surge of growth out of the S11 protests against the 2000 World Economic Forum meeting in Melbourne. Socialist Alternative now claims to have the largest active membership of any far-left organisation in the country.

Socialist Alternative was invited to join the Socialist Alliance in 2001. The Alliance grouped together the Democratic Socialist Perspective, the ISO, and other Australian far-left groups and individuals. Socialist Alternative eventually declined to join due to the Socialist Alliance's strong emphasis on running in parliamentary elections. This parliamentary emphasis in the flat political climate was seen by Socialist Alternative as a restriction to building activism on the ground and representing a turn towards reformist politics. Socialist Alternative entered into unity discussions with the Revolutionary Socialist Party (RSP), who had split from the DSP in 2012, and which included the notable member Van Thanh Rudd (the nephew of former Labor Party (ALP) Prime Minister Kevin Rudd). This merger proposal prompted the Socialist Alliance to reopen unity discussions with Socialist Alternative. In March 2013, Socialist Alternative merged with the RSP. a small organisation which were expelled from the Democratic Socialist Perspective in 2008.

In 2018, Socialist Alternative helped to establish the Victorian Socialists, an electoral project with the aim of winning federal, state and local council positions for socialist candidates in the state of Victoria.

In 2020, SA member Jorge Jorquera was elected as the Victorian Socialist candidate to Maribyrnong Council.

Campaigns

With a presence within most broad-left campaigns, Socialist Alternative has participated in protests against what they perceive as attacks by the Australian Government on industrial relations, student unions and higher education, Aboriginal rights, refugee rights, women's rights, LGBTI rights the environment and free speech. They have been involved in anti-war, anti-racism, anti-Zionism, anti-capitalism, anti-corporate greed and anti-uranium mining demonstrations. Socialist Alternative members are identifiable during street marches with the red flags carried in their contingent or red bloc.

Socialist Alternative has been involved in organising within anti-war campaign groups such as the Stop the War Coalition and has participated in demonstrations across the country, including the protests against the 2011 Commonwealth Heads of Government Meeting, the 2008–2009 war on Gaza, the 2007 APEC Conference, the 2006 G20 Summit, the 2006 war on Lebanon, the wars on Iraq and Afghanistan and have been involved in the Boycott, Divestment and Sanctions campaign and solidarity actions with the Arab Spring.

Since 2004, the Socialist Alternative has participated in the Equal Love campaign – the main campaign group that advocates marriage equality in the country. Many Socialist Alternative members have been elected as National Union of Students Queer Officers and have used this position to promote Equal Love and attack the Rudd-Gillard Government for not repealing John Howard's ban on same-sex marriage. Several Socialist Alternative members are notable for their same-sex marriage activism. Member and Victorian Equal Love Convenor Ali Hogg, was voted the most influential LGBTI Australian by Samesame.com.au and the sixth most influential Melburnian by The Age for her activism in gay and lesbian rights in 2011. Member Roz Ward was the co-founder of the Safe Schools Coalition Australia, the organisation which organised Safe Schools Program.

Since early 2009, Socialist Alternative has been involved in building Students for Palestine, and campus activity, including the protests against the 2010 Gaza flotilla raid and helping fundraise for the Viva Palestina 5. In 2011, Socialist Alternative members were among 19 arrested in a Melbourne demonstration targeting Israeli-owned chocolate chain Max Brenner as part of the international Boycott, Divestment and Sanctions campaign against the state of Israel. The organisation has been criticised as being anti-Semitic by the Australasian Union of Jewish Students. Socialist Alternative maintains that Israel does not represent Jews, but simply claims to do so. The organisation insists that they "take a firm stand against all forms of racism". Socialist Alternative claims that they have "supported innumerable protests against anti-Semitic bigots such as the Holocaust denier David Irving" and believes that Israel's most strident critics are often Jewish themselves, citing Jewish Marxists Leon Trotsky and Rosa Luxemburg in their opposition to Zionism, who saw it as an imperialist ideology.

Socialist Alternative is active within broad campaign groups formed under the Howard government to mobilise opposition to mandatory detention and offshore processing. They have participated in protests against detention centres such as Woomera and Baxter, including the breaking out of refugees in 2001. Socialist Alternative is opposed to the entirety of mandatory detention as a policy and supports open borders. Since the election of the Rudd-Gillard Labor government in 2007, they have continued to organise and campaign around the issue.

Membership routine

Branches
The organisation has branches in Melbourne, Sydney, Brisbane, Canberra, Perth, Adelaide and Wollongong. In Melbourne, Socialist Alternative are based at Victorian Trades Hall. Branches hold meetings to discuss current political developments and Marxist history and theory. Socialist Alternative advertise public meetings through leafleting on street stalls, campuses, at demonstrations and through bill posters.

Student activism

Socialist Alternative maintains student clubs at many universities around Australia, and their political work often emphasises student-based campaigns. The group is involved in organising student protest actions around a number of issues which often draw national attention, such as a stunt during a 2014 episode of Q&A demonstrating opposition to government plans for increased higher education fees, or the large nationwide protests in response to the 2019–20 Australian bushfire crisis.

Socialist Alternative activists have often come under criticism for having a "counter-productive" attitude towards movement work, prioritising recruiting new members and selling newspapers over sustainable activism. They are also known for loud, repetitive chanting of slogans to drown out political debate and to avoid the possibility of actual engagement in reasoned debate over any issue they disagree with They have come under criticism from many in student politics.

According to National Executive member Mick Armstrong, Socialist Alternative's focus on student work is part of a perspective that the organisation has adopted for the political period, due to what they see as their limited size and influence in the working class movement and the lack of any substantial radicalisation in society. Socialist Alternative's political orientation to students mirrors the development of the British Socialist Workers Party during the 1980s.

Socialist Alternative participates in campus student union elections and in the National Union of Students as a faction, and claims to be the largest to the left of the National Labor Students. As revolutionary socialists, the group opposes both the Liberal and Labor parties. They have come under attack from a range of factions in student politics, including Liberal students, both Left and Right Labor students and claim to have been slandered by the Australasian Union of Jewish Students, for their strong opposition to the state of Israel.

Socialist Alternative members have been active in student unions at universities such as Queensland University, Swinburne University of Technology, La Trobe University, University of Melbourne, RMIT, University of Western Sydney, University of Sydney, Charles Sturt University, Curtin University of Technology, University of New South Wales, and Victorian College of the Arts. The membership of the organisation also includes secondary school students, active in their schools.

Socialist Alternative was deregistered as a club at Monash University in September 2014. Matthew Lesh, Political Affairs Director of the pro-Israel Australasian Union of Jewish Students, claimed that members of the organisation refused entry to a group of Jewish students on the basis of their religion and assumed political beliefs. Socialist Alternative denied this claim, noting that the pro-Palestinian event's main speaker was Jewish, and the particular group of students were denied entry after they had refused to sign a petition condemning Israel's economic blockade of Gaza. Socialist Alternative is threatened with no longer receiving funds from the university and not being able to book university venues.

Trade unionism
Members of Socialist Alternative who are employed are politically active within the trade union appropriate for their industry. Socialist Alternative's members are active in trade unions including the National Tertiary Education Union, in which lecturer and Socialist Alternative member Liam Ward was elected to the RMIT University Branch Committee as part of a left-wing oppositional ticket that replaced the previously established union leadership in 2010.

Socialist Alternative reject the practice of forming separate 'red unions' arguing that such projects isolate socialists from the organised working class and are premised on a top-down method of artificially substituting a radical union leadership for the rank and file, instead arguing for activists to rebuild rank and file organisation within existing unions irrespective of their conservative leadership. In 2010, Socialist Alternative member and Queensland Shop, Distributive and Allied Employees Association delegate Duncan Hart organised supporters of same-sex marriage within the union in a rank and file challenge against the socially conservative SDA leader Joe de Bruyn.

Theory
Though one of Socialist Alternative's stated aims is to contribute towards building a revolutionary party that can intervene in – and lead – mass working-class struggles, they do not consider themselves a political party at their current size and influence. Originating in the political tradition of the International Socialist Tendency, Socialist Alternative defend the position that a socialist revolution can only come about through "workers taking control of their workplaces, dismantling existing state institutions (parliaments, courts, the armed forces and police) and replacing them with an entirely new state based on genuinely democratic control by the working class". Describing itself as a "propaganda group" at its current size, Socialist Alternative attempts to relate to its audience primarily on the level of ideas, rather than seeing itself as a party that can be capable of leading mass struggles. While Socialist Alternative supports existing trade unions as essential components of workers' struggles, they believe that capitalism can only be successfully overthrown if a revolutionary party is built to challenge the hold of the ALP and the trade union bureaucracy over the working class, in conjunction with similar parties internationally.

In 2012 the Police Federation of Australia demanded that the Victorian Trades Hall Council cancel a Socialist Alternative public forum on "police racism and violence", as Trades Hall was where the meeting was to take place. The Council complied with the Police Federation's request however the meeting went ahead after a number of people turned up for the meeting and occupied the Trades Hall foyer, causing the Police Federation to split from the council.

Socialist Alternative sees the October 1917 Bolshevik revolution in Russia as a genuine socialist revolution but assert the following "imperialist" attack on the country and the failure of the revolution to spread to Western Europe led to its ultimate defeat by Stalin's "counter-revolution".

Australian parties

SA are hostile to the conservative Liberal Party and are highly critical of the Labor Party (ALP) for its perceived rightward shift and acceptance of neo-liberalism. SA classifies the ALP as a "capitalist workers' party" – seeing it as qualitatively different from the Liberal Party due to its organisational relationship with the trade union bureaucracy – that still governs in the interests of the capitalist class. Socialist Alternative are critical of the ALP's Fair Work Australia, which they see as a similar version of the Liberal's WorkChoices, alongside its maintenance of the Australian Building and Construction Commission.

Socialist Alternative describe the Greens as a middle-class party equally committed to the maintenance of Australian capitalism as the two major parties and accuse them of "populist left nationalism". Socialist Alternative reject reformism outright and defend Rosa Luxemburg's position in her work Social Reform or Revolution that reformism is "not the realisation of socialism, but the reform of capitalism".

Elections
Socialist Alternative maintain the position that parliamentary elections are not the key to social change. However, they do not reject voting in elections outright and see elections reflecting the state of mass political consciousness. Therefore, the organisation promotes who they vote for and who they believe the left should support during election periods, for example calling for the left to unite around SYRIZA in the 2012 Greek legislative election. They have also run members as candidates and supported Stephen Jolly for the Victorian Socialists political party in Victorian elections.

In the 2018 Victorian state and 2019 federal elections Socialist Alternative campaigned alongside the Socialist Alliance to support the newly founded left-wing political party, the Victorian Socialists.

In 2020, Socialist Alternative member Jorge Jorquera was elected as the Victorian Socialists candidate for Maribyrnong Council in Melbourne.

Publications
From 2009 to 2011, members of the organisation edited the annual online theoretical journal, Marxist Interventions (MI). The overall aim of MI was to make Australian Marxist writings more readily accessible to audiences.

In 2010, the organisation launched a biannual theoretical journal, Marxist Left Review, edited by Sandra Bloodworth. The journal aims to "engage with theoretical and political debates on the Australian and international left".

Socialist Alternative also hosts an annual far-left political conference named Marxism, which is the largest conference of its kind in Australia.

See also

 Socialism in Australia
 Victorian Socialists – an electoral alliance formed by Socialist Alternative and others on the Melbourne left
 Equal Love
 Refugee Action Collective
 Stop the War Coalition

References

External links

 Socialist Alternative official website 
 Red Flag online newspaper by Socialist Alternative
 Marxist Left Review Biannual theoretical journal by Socialist Alternative
 Marxism Conference Socialist Alternative annual national conference
 Equal Love Campaign group for same-sex marriage rights in Australia
 Refugee Action Collective Campaign group for refugee advocacy in Australia

Further reading
  Publications written by Socialist Alternative.
  Journal article summarising the group's origins up to 2010.
  Socialist Alternative book on strategies for building socialist organisations.
 
 
 

Anti-imperialism in Oceania
Far-left politics in Australia
Organizations established in 1995
Trotskyist organisations in Australia
International Socialist Tendency
Trotskyism in Australia
Anti-racism in Australia
Anti-Zionism in Australia
Student politics in Australia
Students' unions in Australia
Fourth International (post-reunification)
1995 establishments in Australia